Kennedy Katende (born 15 March 1985) is an Ugandan boxer from Kampala who qualified for the 2008 Olympics in the light-heavyweight division.

His second place behind Kenneth Egan was good enough, he benefitted from his compatriot Badou Jack's decision to fight for Gambia.

In the 2016 Rio Olympics he fought for the country of his birth Uganda.

Professional boxing record

External links

Second Qualifier

1985 births
Living people
Olympic boxers of Sweden
Boxers at the 2008 Summer Olympics
Light-heavyweight boxers
Swedish male boxers
Boxers at the 2016 Summer Olympics
Ugandan male boxers
Olympic boxers of Uganda
African Games bronze medalists for Uganda
African Games medalists in boxing
Competitors at the 2015 African Games
Swedish people of Ugandan descent
Sportspeople from Kampala